Pan Twardowski is a 1921 Polish silent fantasy film directed by Wiktor Biegański and starring Bronisław Oranowski,  Wanda Jarszewska and Antoni Nowara-Piekarski. Biegański was hired by the Polish government to make the film in an effort to foster a greater sense of Polish national identity - particularly in the ethnically mixed Upper Silesia. It is one of many films based on the legend of Pan Twardowski, the Polish word "Pan" being a respectable title often given to members of the nobility or diplomats.

Plot
According to a 16th-century Polish legend, an occultist from Krakow sold his soul to the Devil in exchange for magic powers, but later reneged on the deal. The character is said to have been based on a real-life 16th century German nobleman who lived in Krakow and Nuremberg. There were many variations of the folktale over the years and since this film is now considered lost, it's impossible to tell which variation of the legend was used for the plot. But the 1936 sound film remake is said to have followed the story of this film closely, so the two films' storylines must be very similar.

Cast
 Bronisław Oranowski as Mr. Twardowski 
 Wanda Jarszewska as Mrs. Twardowska 
 Antoni Nowara-Piekarski as Iwan IV Groźny 
 Maria Krzyżanowska as Królowa nimf 
 Mila Kamińska as Ulubienica cara 
 Antoni Siemaszko as Stary bojar 
 Władysław Grabowski as Młody Bojar 
 Stanisław Bryliński as Diabeł 
 Paweł Dydek-Dudziński as Pokurcz 
 Władysław Lenczewski   
 Stanisława Umińska  
 Bruno Winawer   
 Zofia Żukowska

References

Bibliography
Skaff, Sheila. The Law of the Looking Glass: Cinema in Poland, 1896–1939. Ohio University Press, 2008.

External links

1921 films
1920s fantasy films
Polish fantasy films
Polish silent films
1920s Polish-language films
Films directed by Wiktor Bieganski
Films set in Poland
Polish black-and-white films